Alimardan bey Alekber bey oghlu Topchubashov (4 May 1862, Tiflis – 8 November 1934, Paris) was a prominent Azerbaijani politician, foreign minister and speaker of the Parliament of Azerbaijan Democratic Republic.

Biography
There are varied assumptions about the birth date of Topchubashov, different authors and journals claim that he was born in 1865, 1862, 1859 and other similar dates. After all these resorts on archive data, it is finally known that he was born in 4 May in 1863 in Tiflis (now Tbilisi). The Topcubashovs family was originally from Ganca city, but they were living at Tbilisi, near the Char Palace. In 1868, he lost his father and later his mother. Therefore, he was raised by his grandmother.

After studying at Tiflis Gymnasium, he entered Saint Petersburg University and graduated from the law faculty in 1888. While studying in Tiflis Gymnasium, Alimardan bey Topchubashov wrote some comic journals and spread them among students. During university years in Petersburg, he actively participated in Muslim students’ organizations. He was offered to remain at University and teach law if he would convert to Christianity, but he refused and returned to the Caucasus, where he worked at several small positions. He married Pari Malikova, daughter of Hasan bey Zardabi, founder of the first Azerbaijani newspaper, Akinchi.

In 1897 oil magnate Zeynalabdin Taghiyev bought Kaspi newspaper and invited Topchibashov to be its editor-in-chief. Starting from that time he was actively involved in politics and quickly became one of the prominent leaders of Azerbaijani and Muslim people of Russian Empire. His main platform was the political equality of all subjects of Russian Crown and the end to discriminations of Turkic and Muslim people. At the brink of the First Russian Revolution Topchubashov was one of the initiators of famous meeting of Azerbaijani intelligentsia and bourgeoisie at Taghiyev's palace on 15 March 1905. As a result of this meeting a petition was addressed to Tsar asking for:
 Implementation of local self-governing and new type of courts (jury) in the entire Caucasus
 Granting of full political rights and freedoms to the Muslim subjects of the Crown
 Distribution of land to the peasants who lack it
 Improvement of factory legislation to include Muslim workers too.

Under the occupation of the Russian Empire, all Russian Muslims united in an attempt to defend their interests and freedom. In this process, the first All-Russian Muslim Congress was held although official permission couldn't be obtained on 28 August 1905. The focus was on establishing a Union (Ittifaq) to safeguard political and social rights of the Muslims. An excerpt from the speech of Alimardan bey Topchubashov clearly reflects the atmosphere of the congress:

‘We the Turkish sons have the same origin, same ancestry, and same language. From the West to the East, it used to be our ancestors’ lands. In spite of the fact that our ancestors were such a heroic nation, today, in the mountains of Caucasia, in the gardens of the Crimea, in the steppes of Kazan, in the lands of our ancestors, in our homeland we did not have the freedom to speak our own needs. Thank God.. we succeeded (in that) today’.
At the same time, Topchubashov was one of the founders of Ittifaq al-Muslimin (first political party of Russian Muslims) and organized its three conferences. He headed the party's third conference and became its bureau member and chief of its Law Commission. Later he became the leader of the party's Muslim faction at the Russian State Duma, the new Russian parliament (1906). But after the First Duma was dissolved by Tsar Topchubashov was arrested for three months, lost his right to be ever a parliament member, deprived of his place at Baku Municipality and “Kaspi” newspaper.

During this time Iran invited him to head one of the departments of the Iranian Ministry of Justice and reform its judiciary system, but Topchubashov rejected this offer and remained in Russian Empire to continue his struggle for the emancipation of the Muslim population.

After the Azerbaijan Democratic Republic was proclaimed on 28 May 1918, Topchubashov became its ambassador to Armenia, Georgia and the Ottoman Empire, and was sent to Istanbul. Then he was made minister of foreign affairs at the second cabinet and was elected the head of the Parliament in absentia on 7 December 1918, thus becoming second head of state of Azerbaijan Democratic Republic, after Mammed Amin Rasulzade. Agreeing to head the Azerbaijani Delegation at Versailles Conference, he left Istanbul for Paris.

At the conference, he managed to meet US President Woodrow Wilson and achieved the de facto recognition of the Azerbaijan Democratic Republic in January 1920. But after the Bolshevik takeover of ADR he could not return and stayed in Paris, where he died on 8 November 1934. He is buried in the communal cemetery of Saint-Cloud (near Paris), with his wife who died in 1947, and two other people who bear his name.
Topchubashov never gave up his job even when he was in France. He published books, brochures, and journals in an attempt to introduce and represent Azerbaijan to foreigners.

Memoralisation
The Baku-based  Topchubashov Center think tank is named after him

References

External links

 Alimardan Topchubashov in Azerbaijan International

1863 births
1934 deaths
Politicians from Tbilisi
Diplomats from Tbilisi
People from Tiflis Governorate
Muslims from Georgia (country)
Azerbaijani Muslims
Converts to Sunni Islam from Shia Islam
Georgian Azerbaijanis
Azerbaijani nobility
Members of the 1st State Duma of the Russian Empire
Russian Constituent Assembly members
Azerbaijan Democratic Republic politicians
Ambassadors of Azerbaijan to Armenia
Ambassadors of Azerbaijan to Georgia (country)
Ambassadors of Azerbaijan to the Ottoman Empire
Azerbaijani independence activists
Lawyers from the Russian Empire
Saint Petersburg State University alumni